Alvin is a populated place in Yuma County, Colorado, United States.

Geography
Alvin is located at  (40.3077702,-102.0757432).

References

Populated places in Yuma County, Colorado